Angel Zdravchev (born 10 July 1994) is a Bulgarian footballer, currently playing as a midfielder for Borislav Parvomay.

Career

Litex Lovech
Zdravchev joined Litex academy in 2007 from Maritsa Plovdiv academy. In 2011, he made his professional debut for Litex at age of 16. In 2013, he was loaned out to Vidima-Rakovski until end of the season. Two years later, he was loaned out to Vereya for the remainder of the season. In 2015, he was released from the team.

Dunav Ruse
On 29 December 2015 he signed for Dunav Ruse after coming as a free agent.

Levski Karlovo
In February 2017, Zdravchev joined Levski Karlovo.

Borislav
In July 2017, Zdravchev joined Third League club Borislav Parvomay.

Club statistics

Club

References

Living people
1994 births
Footballers from Plovdiv
Bulgarian footballers
Bulgaria youth international footballers
Association football midfielders
PFC Litex Lovech players
PFC Vidima-Rakovski Sevlievo players
FC Vereya players
FC Dunav Ruse players
FC Levski Karlovo players
First Professional Football League (Bulgaria) players
Second Professional Football League (Bulgaria) players